The 2008 Pan American Combined Events Championships were held in Santo Domingo, Dominican Republic, at the Estadio Olímpico Félix Sánchez on May 31 – June 1, 2008. 
A detailed report on the event and an appraisal of the results was given.

Complete results were published.

Medallists

Results

Men's Decathlon
Key

Women's Heptathlon
Key

Participation
An unofficial count yields the participation of 41 athletes from 15 countries.

 (1)
 (6)
 (4)
 (2)
 (2)
 (5)
 (2)
 (1)
 (1)
 (2)
 (3)
 (1)
 (3)
 (6)
 (2)

See also
 2008 in athletics (track and field)

References

Pan American Combined Events Cup
Pan American Combined Events Championships
International athletics competitions hosted by the Dominican Republic
Pan American Combined Events Championships